Perigrapha is a genus of fungi within the Arthoniales order that is parasitic on lichens.  The genus has not been placed into a family.

References

Arthoniomycetes
Lichenicolous fungi
Taxa named by Josef Hafellner